Gheorghe Riffelt (born 6 January 1936) is a Romanian rower. He competed at the 1960 Summer Olympics and the 1964 Summer Olympics.

References

1936 births
Living people
Romanian male rowers
Olympic rowers of Romania
Rowers at the 1960 Summer Olympics
Rowers at the 1964 Summer Olympics
People from Târnăveni